Steinherr is a German surname meaning stone lord. Notable people with the surname include:

 Marlene Steinherr (born 1985), German sailor
 Thomas Steinherr (born 1993), German footballer

German-language surnames